Catrin Maria Nilsmark (born 30 August 1967) is a Swedish professional golfer who played on both the United States-based LPGA Tour and the Ladies European Tour.

Early life 
Nilsmark was born in Gothenburg, Sweden. She grew up in Lerum east of Gothenburg and began her golf career at Öijared Golf Club, Sweden's first golf club with two 18-hole courses.

Amateur career 
In 1984 she became the Swedish Youth under-19 Champion. She won the Orange Bowl International Junior Championship in Coral Gables, Florida in December 1984. She played one year of collegiate golf at the University of South Florida in Tampa, Florida.

Professional career
Nilsmark turned professional in 1987 but her early career was hampered by a whiplash injury sustained in a car accident. She had her maiden LET victory at the 1994 Ford Golf Classic  at Woburn Golf and Country Club, England and joined the U.S.-based LPGA Tour in 1995 having tied for 15th at the 1994 LPGA Final Qualifying Tournament to earn exempt status.

She had two victories in 1999. On the Ladies European Tour, she won the Evian Masters in Évian-les-Bains, France, beating Laura Davies, who was at the top of her career, with two strokes. That victory came the year before the tournament became an LPGA co-sanctioned event. It was later designated by the LPGA Tour as a major championship in women's golf. Nilsmark also won the 1999 Valley of the Stars Championship at the Oakmont Country Club in Glendale, California on the LPGA Tour, beating Annika Sörenstam in a playoff. Nilsmark finished the year a career best second on the Ladies European Tour and 40th on the LPGA Tour.

Nilsmark played in the Solheim Cup in 1992, 1994, 1996, 1998 and 2000, sinking the winning putt in 1992 in Europe's first victory over the United States. She was the victorious European Solheim Cup captain in 2003 at Barsebäck Golf &Country Club in her native Sweden, despite suffering from a serious back injury and leading the European team walking with crutches on the course, and the losing captain in the 2005 match. She was captain of The 2007 European PING Junior Solheim Cup Team.

Her career was interrupted by injuries and pregnancy in 2004, but in 2008, she came back to competitive golf, playing regularly on the Swedish Golf Tour, at the time named SAS Masters Tour, representing Vidbynäs Golf Club and winning twice. She later came to represent Stockholm Golf Club.

After retiring from tournament golf in 2008, she came back at 52 years of age, playing two tournaments on the Swedish Golf Tour in 2019.

Personal life 
Nilsmark in 1995 married Henrik Wickberg and after their divorce, she 1998-2007 was married to Fredrik Hellqvist, sport journalist and former head of Swedish European Tour tournament Scandinavian Masters 2005-2013. During her LPGA Tour career, Nilsmark and Hellqvist, who changed his last name to Nilsmark, lived in West Palm Beach, Florida, United States, in a house formerly owned by Tony Jacklin and situated close to were Swedish golfer Jesper Parnevik lived.

She later married Per-Uno Sandberg and the couple resides in Danderyd, north of Stockholm, Sweden.

She has two children, daughter Tuva Augusta, born 1997 and son, Sigge, born 2004. In the seventh month of her pregnancy in 1997, she competed in the LET tournament Compaq Open in Stockholm, Sweden, finishing lone runner-up to Annika Sörenstam, ahead of third placed Nancy Lopez. The following week, she won on the Swedish Golf Tour.

She is an honorary member at Öijared Golf Club, Sweden and at Dalmahoy Hotel & Country Club, Edinburgh, Scotland and an honorary member of the PGA of Sweden.

She worked as a golf commentator in Sweden at the television channel Viasat Golf 2007–2017.

Amateur wins
1984 Swedish Youth under-19 Championship, Orange Bowl International Junior Championship

Professional wins (8)

LPGA Tour wins (1)

LPGA Tour playoff record (1–0)

Ladies European Tour wins (2)

''Note: Nilsmark won The Evian Championship (formerly named the Evian Masters) once before it was co-sanctioned by the LPGA Tour in 2000 and recognized as a major championship on the LPGA Tour in 2013.

Swedish Golf Tour wins (5)
1991 Höganäs Ladies Open
1997 Lerum Ladies Open, Öhrlings Swedish Match-play Championship
2008 PGA Ladies Open, IT-Arkitekterna Ladies Open

Team appearances
Professional
Solheim Cup (representing Europe): 1992 (winners), 1994, 1996, 1998, 2000 (winners), 2003 (non-playing captain, winners), 2005 (non-playing captain)
Praia d'El Rey European Cup (representing  Ladies European Tour): 1998 (tie)
Handa Cup (representing World team): 2012 (tie)

References

External links

Swedish female golfers
South Florida Bulls women's golfers
Ladies European Tour golfers
LPGA Tour golfers
Solheim Cup competitors for Europe
Sportspeople from Gothenburg
Golfers from Stockholm
1967 births
Living people